Jeannette Walls (born April 21, 1960) is an American author and journalist widely known as former gossip columnist for MSNBC.com and author of The Glass Castle, a memoir of the nomadic family life of her childhood. Published in 2005, it had been on the New York Times Best Seller list for 421 weeks as of June 3, 2018. She is a 2006 recipient of the Alex Awards and Christopher Award.

Early life and education
Walls was born on April 21, 1960, in Phoenix, Arizona, to Rex Walls and Rose Mary Walls. Walls has two sisters, Lori and Maureen, and one brother, Brian. Walls' family life was rootless, with the family shuttling from Phoenix to California (including a brief stay in the Tenderloin district of San Francisco), to Battle Mountain, Nevada, and to Welch, West Virginia, with periods of homelessness. When they finally landed in Rex's Appalachian hometown of Welch the family lived in a three-room house without plumbing or heat.

Walls moved to New York at age 17 to join her sister Lori (at that point a waitress and soon working as an artist for Archie Comics). With the aid of grants, loans, scholarships and a year spent answering phones at a Wall Street law firm she was thereafter able to complete a bachelor's degree in Liberal Arts at Barnard College.

Education 
Walls graduated from Barnard College in 1984 with honors.

Career
Early in her career Walls interned at a Brooklyn newspaper called The Phoenix and eventually became a full-time reporter there. From 1987 to 1993 she wrote the "Intelligencer" column for New York magazine. She then wrote a gossip column for Esquire, from 1993 to 1998, then contributed regularly to the gossip column "Scoop" at MSNBC.com from 1998 until her departure to write full-time in 2007. Walls has contributed to USA Today, and has appeared on The Today Show, CNN, Primetime, and The Colbert Report.

Her 2000 book, Dish: The Inside Story on the World of Gossip, was a humorous history of the role gossip has played in U.S. media, politics and life.

In 2005, Walls published the best-selling memoir The Glass Castle, which details the joys and struggles of her childhood. It offers a look into her life and that of her dysfunctional family. The Glass Castle was well received by critics and the public. It has sold over 4 million copies and has been translated into 31 languages. It received the Christopher Award, the American Library Association's Alex Award (2006), and the Books for Better Living Award. Paramount bought the film rights to the book, and in March 2013 announced that actress Jennifer Lawrence would play Walls in the film adaptation. On October 9, 2015, it was reported that Lawrence withdrew from the film and she would be replaced by actress Brie Larson.

In 2009, Walls published her first novel, Half Broke Horses: A True-Life Novel, based on the life of her grandmother Lily Casey Smith. It was named one of the ten best books of 2009 by the editors of The New York Times Book Review.

Walls' novel The Silver Star was published in 2013. Her novel, Hang the Moon: A Novel, is scheduled for publication in March, 2023.

Works cited 

 The Silver Star. Scribner, 2013.

Personal life
Walls married Eric Goldberg in 1988; they divorced in 1996. She married fellow New York writer John J. Taylor in 2002, and the couple now lives outside Culpeper, Virginia, on a 205-acre farm.

In popular culture

Her memoir has been adapted into a film with the same name The Glass Castle, where actress Brie Larson portrayed Walls.

References

External links
Publisher's biography

1960 births
Living people
American memoirists
American television journalists
American non-fiction writers
Barnard College alumni
Journalists from West Virginia
People from Culpeper County, Virginia
People from Welch, West Virginia
Writers from Phoenix, Arizona
Writers from Nevada
Writers from Virginia
Writers from West Virginia
American women memoirists
Journalists from Virginia
American women television journalists
21st-century American women